"" ("Put on the costume", often referred to as "On With the Motley", from the original 1893 translation by Frederic Edward Weatherly) is a tenor aria from Ruggero Leoncavallo's 1892 opera Pagliacci. "" is sung at the conclusion of the first act, when Canio discovers his wife's infidelity, but must nevertheless prepare for his performance as Pagliaccio the clown because "the show must go on".

The aria is often regarded as one of the most moving in the operatic repertoire of the time. The pain of Canio is portrayed in the aria and exemplifies the entire notion of the "tragic clown": smiling on the outside but crying on the inside. This is still displayed today, as the clown motif often features the painted-on tear running down the cheek of the performer.

Enrico Caruso's recordings of the aria, from 1902, 1904 and 1907, were among the top selling records of the 78-rpm era and reached over a million sales.

This aria is often used in popular culture, and has been featured in many renditions, mentions, and spoofs, and is often misspelled "guibba" instead of "giubba" on many recordings.

Libretto

Recitar! Mentre preso dal delirio,
non so più quel che dico,
e quel che faccio!
Eppur è d'uopo, sforzati!
Bah! Sei tu forse un uom?
Tu se' Pagliaccio!

Vesti la giubba e la faccia infarina.
La gente paga, e rider vuole qua.
E se Arlecchin t'invola Colombina,
ridi, Pagliaccio, e ognun applaudirà!
Tramuta in lazzi lo spasmo ed il pianto
in una smorfia il singhiozzo e 'l dolor, Ah!

Ridi, Pagliaccio,
col tuo amore infranto!
Ridi del duol, che t'avvelena il cor!
Act! While in delirium,
I no longer know what I say,
or what I do!
And yet it's necessary. Force yourself!
Bah! Are you even a man?
You are a clown!

Put on your costume and powder your face.
The people are paying, and they want to laugh here.
And if Harlequin steals away your Columbina,
laugh, clown, and all will applaud!
Turn your distress and tears into jokes,
your pain and sobs into a smirk, Ah!

Laugh, clown,
at your broken love!
Laugh at the grief that poisons your heart!

In popular culture

Both the melody of the aria and dramatic points of the opera from which it comes are referenced by Homer and Jethro in the 1953 Spike Jones song "Pal Yat Chee" on RCA Victor
The melody is set to lyrics about Kellogg's Rice Krispies breakfast cereal in an American television commercial for that product, circa 1970.
The melody of the song was used by the rock band Queen in their 1984 single "It's a Hard Life" when frontman Freddie Mercury sang that song's opening lyrics "I don't want my freedom, there's no reason for living with a broken heart."
The aria is heard several times in the 1992 Seinfeld episode "The Opera", including over the episode's end credits instead of the Seinfeld theme.
The opera is performed in The Simpsons episode "The Italian Bob" (2005) in which Sideshow Bob sings the final verse of the aria.
Verses from the aria are used in both Italian and English in the song "A Metaphor for the Dead" by the metal band Anaal Nathrakh on their 2012 album Vanitas.
In the show Harvey Birdman, Attorney at Law, the final verse is sung by rival lawyer Evelyn Spyro Throckmorton in the episode "The Dabba Don"

References

External links

Arias by Ruggero Leoncavallo
Songs about clowns
Songs about heartache
Opera excerpts
1892 compositions
United States National Recording Registry recordings
Tenor arias